Warren King (January 3, 1916 – February 9, 1978) was a cartoonist best noted for his political cartoons.

King grew up on Long Island and received a B.S. from Fordham University in 1938. King was trained as a painter and attended the Phoenix Art Institute and the Grand Central School of Art. During WWII Warren King served with the Army Air Corps, where his college education and artistic skills were both valued. He was honorably discharged in 1946 and returned to NYC to resume his career in illustration. In 1955, King became editorial cartoonist for the New York Daily News after working as Rube Goldberg's assistant.

He received the National Cartoonist Society Editorial Cartoon Award for 1968 as well as several Freedoms Foundation awards. He was a member of NCS and the Association of American of Editorial Cartoonists.

King retired in 1977 and died in Connecticut on February 9, 1978.

References

 NCS Awards
 Warren King Papers at the Syracuse University Library

1916 births
1978 deaths
American editorial cartoonists
Artists from New York (state)
Fordham University alumni
People from Long Island
United States Army Air Forces personnel of World War II